Valentine Jenkin or Jenkins was an English decorative painter working in Scotland in the 17th century.

Accounts of his work mention that he was an "English man". He was a burgess of Glasgow. In 1627 he painted the globe and the weather vane of the steeple at the Glasgow Tolbooth.

Jenkins redecorated the Chapel Royal at Stirling Castle in 1628, refreshing painted decoration from 1594 inside and out. Within the chapel, a painted frieze with festoons of leaves and fruit and (now blank) medallions, is his work. The frieze was described in 1628 as a "course of panels, arms, and badges conform to the roof and border". The painted freize is visible (with some restoration) within the chapel, and external paintwork has left discernible traces and shadows on the courtyard façade.

Materials bought for Jenkin and his team of painters at Stirling in 1617 included, red lead, florey (a kind of indigo), umber, linseed oil, skins for making glue size, butter, and jars called "pigs". In 1628 he was bought chalk, oil, and colours.

Jenkin made two contracts for painting the rooms of the palace of Stirling Castle and the Chapel Royal in 1628. On the exterior of the palace he gilded and painted the royal initials and crowns, and painted the window grills or yetts with red oil paint. Details on the gatehouse and its coat of arms were painted the same. Inside, the window shutters were painted, and he restored the existing painted borders and royal ciphers. He marbled the chimneys. The queen's bedchamber was to be "fair wrought with arms and antiques" according to the ceiling details. He also painted the rooms and passages on the floor above, including two rooms for the Duke of Buckingham which were above the king's bedchamber, accessible via a private stair. The upstairs rooms were painted gray and white, with imitation panelling in the passages. Nothing survives of this work, although nearly all the rooms mentioned in Jenkin's contract survive.

Jenkin rode from Stirling to paint and gild three great carved oak heraldic panels for the exterior of the gate house of Falkland Palace in 1629. The wooden armorials today are 19th-century replacements.

A vaulted first-floor room at Kinneil House, known as the Arbour Room, was redecorated around the year 1620 for James Hamilton, 2nd Marquess of Hamilton and his wife Ann Cunningham. Her "shakefork" and the rabbit supporters of Cunningham heraldry can still be seen. This painting was almost certainly the work of Valentine Jenkins, who worked for family elsewhere.

There were several painters at work in Scotland at the time, and Andrew Home was recorded as Jenkins' assistant at Stirling. Some decorative painters based in London worked in Scotland, including Edward Arthur, George Crawford, and Matthew Goodrick.

References

17th-century Scottish people
Scottish interior designers
Artists from Glasgow
17th-century Scottish painters
Scottish male painters
17th-century Scottish businesspeople
People of Stirling Castle
People of Falkland Palace